Katerina Anastasiou (born 22 January 1973) is a Greek cross-country skier. She competed in the women's 5 kilometre classical at the 1998 Winter Olympics.

References

External links
 

1973 births
Living people
Greek female cross-country skiers
Olympic cross-country skiers of Greece
Cross-country skiers at the 1998 Winter Olympics
Place of birth missing (living people)